Nasi tumpang is a rice dish originating in Kelantan, Malaysia. Nasi tumpang is rice with different layer of dishes wrapped in a cone shape with banana leaf packed. Traditionally, it was staple food for travelers or farmers in Kelantan to bring to work. It is packed tightly consisting an omelette, beef or fish floss, and shrimp or fish local curry, sweet sambal gravy and cucumbers.

References 

Egg dishes
Malaysian rice dishes
Malay words and phrases
Omelettes